Lyonshall  is a historic village and civil parish in Herefordshire, England. The civil parish includes the hamlet of Penrhos.  According to the 2001 Census, the civil parish had a population of 750, increasing to 757 at the 2011 Census.

Geography 
Lyonshall is a parish in the north-west corner of the county of Herefordshire, England. It is near to the border with Wales and has significant stretches of Offa's Dyke running through it. The northern boundary of the parish is marked by the River Arrow. Lyonshall Parish covers 5,000 acres (2,000 hectares) and is on the Black and White Village Trail. The population of 750 people live in 280 households spread across the parish and centred in the village.

History 
Lyonshall was listed under the name Lenehalle the Domesday Book of 1086. The entry reads: 'LYONSHALL. Walter holds from him. Thorkell held from Earl Harold. 5 hides which pay tax. In Lordship 2 ploughs; 3 villagers, 11 smallholders and 3 riding men with 5 ploughs. 5 slaves, male and female. From some men settled there 110d are given for as long as they wish. Value before 1066, 60s; now 50s.' Lyonshall is listed as being in the land of Roger of Lacy in Elsdon Hundred. Other villages in the same Hundred were Hopley's Green, Woonton, Eardisley and Letton. Also listed in Domesday Book are the adjacent parishes of Kington, Titley and Rushock, all described as non-tax paying waste lands. To the east of Lyonshall lies Pembridge, which, like Lyonshall, is described as a reasonable sized manor.

Lyonshall local dialect was recorded as part of the Survey of English Dialects. The village's name was omitted from the list of localities in the published Linguistic Atlas of England but it is shown on the maps as site 7 in Herefordshire.

Lyonshall Castle
Lyonshall Castle is a ruin in private ownership, with moat and outer enclosure covering about three acres. The building of the castle started in about 1090 when the Devereux family, sometimes referred to as d'Évreux or D'Ebroicis, held it as lords of the manor from Roger de Lacy. Lyonshall was important as one of the border manors of the Marcher lords. Its position, occupying a useful spot on the roads to and from Wales, attracted military interest, and many of the castle occupants continued to lead lives of national significance, often serving in the Royal Courts. Many of Lyonshall's lords have been significant figures, both famous and infamous. In 1322 the castle is mentioned as being part of the estates of Bartholomew de Badlesmere, 1st Baron Badlesmere, who was described on his execution as "a great Baron and as great a Rebel." After Magna Carta some of the Marcher Lords continued to be troublesome to the king. Bartholomew's only son, Giles, died without issue, Lyonshall becoming the property of his sister and co-heir Maud who married John de Vere, 7th Earl of Oxford who fought in the Battle of Crecy in 1346.

In 1382 Lyonshall passed to Simon de Burley, a royal favourite. Introduced to court at a young age, he went to sea at the age of 14 to fight the Spanish, and he was a soldier until his capture by the French at Poitou in 1369. He was a court tutor, and his former pupil, Richard II, made him Governor of Windsor and Llanstephan, Master of Falconry and Keeper of the Royal Mews; he also received manors and estates in reward for his service. However, he was charged with treason by the Duke of Gloucester and although the king and queen personally knelt to beg for his pardon, he was executed on 15 May 1388.

The castle ruins are on Historic England's Heritage at Risk Register due to their poor condition.

Lords of Lyonshall Castle

Community 
The parish has the church of St Michael & All Angels and the Lyonshall Memorial Hall. The Parish Council is well supported and achieves improvements around the parish and voices opinions of parishioners to the Herefordshire Council.
There is no post office in the village and the Royal George pub is closed.

In the 19th century, from about 1870 to sometime in the 1890s, the Vicar of Lyonshall was Charles Madison Green, whose wife, Ella, was the eldest sister of author H. Rider Haggard, famous for King Solomon's Mines and She.

Economy
Lyonshall parish has a largely agricultural economy. It hosts six substantial poultry farms, produces blackcurrants, potatoes and livestock as well as the normal arable crops.

The major businesses are Burgoynes of Lyonshall – which owns farms, hires marquees and runs a fleet of lorries – and Lynhales Nursing Home which employs almost 100 people in caring for around 50 elderly residents in a historic manor house.

As well as the larger businesses there is a myriad of smaller, often one-person enterprises spread across the parish. The Royal George pub, now closed, is in the centre of the village and is a black and white building dating from 1600. Since its closure and purchase from its previous owner, it has fallen into a poor state of repair. It was originally named The George, but was renamed after the naval disaster of 1782 when the flagship The Royal George sank at Spithead with the loss of 900 lives. There is a company, The Four-Poster Bed Coy, producing hand-made beds and other furniture specialising in the use of sustainable local oak. Mayglothlings Waste Ltd is based in the parish and has a fleet of tankers seen around the West Midlands, as well as Mercia Drain Ltd that is in the same line of business.

In popular culture
Sue Gee's 2004 novel The Mysteries of Glass concerns a curate working in the parish of St. Michael and All Angels in Lyonshall in 1860/1.

Gallery

References

Notes

External links 

Lyonshall's Parish Website
Burgoynes of Lyonshall
Lynhales Nursing Home
The Four Poster Bed Company

Villages in Herefordshire